Francisc Forika (born 16 June 1954) is a Romanian biathlete. He competed in the 10 km sprint event at the 1984 Winter Olympics.

References

1954 births
Living people
Romanian male biathletes
Olympic biathletes of Romania
Biathletes at the 1984 Winter Olympics
People from Harghita County